The middle superior alveolar nerve or middle superior dental nerve is a nerve that drops from the infraorbital portion of the maxillary nerve to supply the sinus mucosa, the roots of the maxillary premolars, and the mesiobuccal root of the first maxillary molar.
It is not always present; in 72% of cases it is non existent with the anterior superior alveolar nerve innervating the premolars and the posterior superior alveolar nerve innervating the molars, including the mesiobuccal root of the first molar.

See also 
 Alveolar nerve (Dental nerve)
 Superior alveolar nerve (Superior dental nerve)
 Anterior superior alveolar nerve (Anterior superior dental nerve)
 Posterior superior alveolar nerve (Posterior superior dental nerve)
 Inferior alveolar nerve (Inferior dental nerve)

External links
 

Maxillary nerve